SABR is the Society for American Baseball Research.

SABR may also refer to:
 Sabr, an Islamic term that roughly translates to patience
 Sabre Corporation (NASDAQ: SABR), an American travel technology company
 SABR volatility model, in mathematical finance
 Scalable Agile Beam Radar (AN/APG-83), a fire control radar for the F-16 Fighting Falcon and other aircraft
 Selectable Assault Battle Rifle, an alternative name for the XM29 OICW
 Sneak Attack By Roger, an informal tennis acronym in reference to Roger Federer
 Stereotactic ablative body radiotherapy